Lancelotto Politi (religious name Ambrosius Catharinus, 1483–1553) was an Italian Dominican canon lawyer, theologian and bishop.

Historians and theologians generally have regarded Catharinus as a brilliant eccentric. He was frequently accused of teaching false doctrines, yet always kept within the bounds of orthodoxy.

Life
Politi was born at Siena.  At sixteen he became Doctor of Civil and Canon Law (J.U.D.) in the academy of Siena. After visiting many academies in Italy and France he was appointed (1508) a professor at Siena, and had among his pupils Giovanni del Monte, afterwards Pope Julius III, and Sixtus of Siena, a converted Jew who esteemed his master, yet severely criticized some of his writings.

About 1513 he entered the Order of St. Dominic in the convent of St. Mark, at Florence. He studied scripture and theology without a master. This may account for his independence, and his defence of opinions which were singular, especially in regard to predestination, the certitude of possessing grace, the residence of bishops in their dioceses, and the intention required in the minister of a sacrament.

He was a strenuous defender of Catholicism against Martin Luther and his followers; and was prominent in the discussions of the Council of Trent, to which he was called by his former pupil, Cardinal del Monte, legate of Paul III. In the third, public, session (4 February 1546), Catharinus, pronounced a notable discourse, later published ["Oratio ad Patres Conc. Trid." (Louvain, 1567; Paris, 1672)].

Notwithstanding attacks upon his teaching he was appointed Bishop of Minori in 1546, and, in 1552, Archbishop of Conza, Province of Naples. Pope Julius III, successor of Paul III, called Politi to Rome, intending, says Jacques Échard, to elevate him to the cardinalate, but he died before reaching Rome.

Pallavicini and other authorities declare that the Council of Trent did not condemn his singular opinions. He defended the Immaculate Conception of the Blessed Virgin. According to Échard, he regretted towards the end of his life the vehemence with which he had combatted Cardinal Cajetan and Father Dominic Soto.  He died at Naples.

Works

His principal works (for complete list see Echard) are:

 "Apologia pro veritate catholicæ et apostolicæ fldei ac doctrinæ, adversus impia ac pestifera Martini Lutheri dogmata" (Florence, 1520);
"Speculum hæreticorum" (Lyons, 1541), with two opuscula on original sin and justification;
"Annotationes in commentaria Cajetani super sacram Scripturam" (Lyons, 1542);
"Tractatus quæstionis quo jure episcoporum residentia debeatur" (Venice, 1547);
"Defensio catholicorum pro possibili certitudine gratiæ" (ibid., 1547);
"Es bonus corripuit editor ad hoc intendere usus invexit errorem." (Rome, 1548);
"Summa doctrinæ de prædestinatione" (Rome, 1550);
 "Commentaria in omnes D. Pauli epistolas et alias septem canonicas" (Venice, 1551);
"Disputatio pro veritate immaculatæ conceptionis B. Virginis" (Rome, 1551).

He also published numerous opuscula, e. g., on Providence and predestination, on the state of children dying without baptism; on giving communion to young children; on celibacy; on the Scriptures and their translation into the vernacular.

References

Attribution
 The entry cites:
Quétif-Échard, Script. Ord. Praed., II (Paris, 1721), 144;
Touron, Hist. des hommes illustres de l'Ordre de S. Dom., IV (Paris. 1747), 128;
Pallavicino, Hist. Conc. Trid.: De int. ministri, De Resid. epis. (Antwerp, 1670; Cologne, 1717, 1727);
Sixtus Senensis, Bibliotheca Sancta, Bks. IV, V, VI (Venice, 1566).

External links
 

1483 births
1553 deaths
Italian Dominicans
Canon law jurists
Participants in the Council of Trent
16th-century Italian lawyers
16th-century Roman Catholic archbishops in the Kingdom of Naples
People from Siena
University of Siena alumni
Academic staff of the University of Siena